Dog of Two Head is the fourth studio album by the English rock band Status Quo, released by Pye Records in November 1971.

Background
At the time of recording, the band consisted of Francis Rossi (credited on the sleeve as Mike Rossi), Rick Parfitt (credited as Ritchie Parfitt), Alan Lancaster and John Coghlan (credited as John Coughlan). They had released a non-album single that March, a Rossi/Young song called "Tune to the Music", but it was not a hit. The band then set to work writing and recording a new album. A couple of the songs, such as the opening track "Umleitung" (German for 'diversion'), had been written the previous year.

Rossi and Young's "Mean Girl", a single from the album, was to become a UK #20 hit some time later, in April 1973, after they had their third top ten British hit single with "Paper Plane", from their next album Piledriver. When "Mean Girl" charted, the record company decided to release another single from the album: a rerecording of "Gerdundula", the B-side to their 1970 single "In My Chair". This was released in July 1973, and failed to chart. The B-side to this single was Rossi and Parfitt's "Lakky Lady", taken from the band's previous album Ma Kelly's Greasy Spoon.

Reception

AllMusic largely praised the album's unusual stylistics in their retrospective review, commenting that Status Quo "were going to find their characteristic sound in their posterior effort, Piledriver, but never again were they going to sound as innovative and inventive as they sound here."

Track listing
All songs written by Francis Rossi and Bob Young, except where noted.
Side one
 "Umleitung" (Alan Lancaster, Roy Lynes) - 7:11
 "Nanana (Extraction I)" - 0:51
 "Something's Going on in My Head" (Lancaster) - 4:44
 "Mean Girl" - 3:53
 "Nanana (Extraction II)" - 1:11
Side two
 "Gerdundula" - 3:49
 "Railroad" - 5:30
 "Someone's Learning" (Lancaster) - 7:08
 "Nanana" - 2:26

1998 bonus tracks
 "Tune to the Music" [previously unreleased version] - 3:36   
 "Good Thinking" [previously unreleased version] - 3:40   
 "Time to Fly" (Lancaster)  - 4:18   
 "Nanana" [previously unreleased version] - 2:58   
 "Mean Girl" [previously unreleased version] - 3:58

2003 reissue bonus tracks
 "Mean Girl" [early mix] - 3:58
 "Tune to the Music" - 3:09
 "Good Thinking" (Rossi, Rick Parfitt, Lancaster, John Coghlan, Young) - 3:43
 "Mean Girl" [BBC session]
 "Railroad" [BBC session]

Personnel
Status Quo
 Francis Rossi – lead guitar, acoustic guitar, lead vocals
 Rick Parfitt – rhythm guitar, acoustic guitar, piano, backing vocals, co-lead vocals on "Railroad"
 Alan Lancaster – bass, guitar
 John Coghlan – drums, percussion

Additional personnel

Bob Young – harmonica
Bruce Foster – piano
Grass – backing vocals on "Nanana"

References

Status Quo (band) albums
1971 albums
Pye Records albums
Albums produced by John Schroeder (musician)